Downtown Dubai or The Dubai Downtown, is a large-scale, mixed-use complex in Dubai, United Arab Emirates. The Dubai Downtown was created by the Emaar Real Estate Development Company. Before 2000, the place was called Umm Al Tarif. It is home to some of the city's largest landmarks including Burj Khalifa, The Dubai Mall, and The Dubai Fountain.

The development is situated along Sheikh Zayed Road, across from Al Wasl locality on the northwest. It is bounded to the south by Business Bay and to the northeast by Financial Centre Road, which separates it from Zabeel 2 and Trade Centre 2.

Arabic low-rise vernacular style of architecture is present in the Old Town, while high-rise contemporary buildings dominate the rest of the development. Downtown Dubai offers a range of high-end hotels such as Address Downtown, Vida Downtown, Al Manzil Downtown, as well as attractions such as a luxury Arabian market, Souk Al Bahar and a 3.5 km-long strip of restaurants and cafes on Sheikh Mohammad bin Rashid Boulevard. Souk Al Bahar has over 100 shops and over 20 restaurants, cafes and lounges adjacent to the Dubai Fountains.

Landmarks

Burj Khalifa 

Burj Khalifa is the centrepiece of The Dubai Downtown. At , it is the tallest building in the world and the tallest man-made structure ever built. Construction began on 21 September 2004, and was completed and ready for occupancy by 4 January 2010. Burj Khalifa is estimated to have cost US$1.5 billion. In addition to being the tallest building in the world, Burj Khalifa holds six other world records, including ‘tallest free-standing structure in the world’, ‘elevator with the longest running distance in the world’ and ‘highest number of storeys in the world’.

The Dubai Mall 

The Dubai Mall is the world's second largest shopping mall by total area. It is the home of 1,300 stores in addition to numerous attractions, including an Olympic-size ice rink, an aquarium and a water zoo. In March 2018, the owner of The Dubai Mall, Emaar Properties, opened an entertainment complex by the name of VR Park, which blends augmented reality and virtual reality (VR). Access to the mall is provided via Doha Street, rebuilt as a double-decker road in April 2009. The Dubai Mall opened on November 4, 2008, with about 600 retailers. The Dubai Mall is the most visited retail destination in the United Arab Emirates with approximately 80,000,000 visitors annually.

Fashion Avenue 
In March 2018, Emaar Malls unveiled a new extension of The Dubai Mall dedicated to fashion and luxury shopping. The 440,000-square-foot Fashion Avenue offers over 150 prestigious brands, including Burberry, Cartier, Miu Miu, Prada, Gucci, Mikimoto, Faberge, Valentino, and Christian Louboutin.

Dubai Fountain 

At the center of Downtown Dubai and at a cost of Dh 800 million (US$217 million), The Dubai Fountain is the largest choreographed system in the world. It was designed by WET Design, the California-based company responsible for the fountains at the Bellagio Hotel Lake in Las Vegas. On 26 October 2008, Emaar announced, based on results of a naming contest, the fountain would be named the Dubai Fountain.

Address Downtown Dubai 
 
Address Downtown Dubai is a supertall skyscraper rising  alongside the Dubai Mall, the Old Town, and the Burj Khalifa Lake in Dubai, United Arab Emirates.  This hotel and the residential tower contains a total of 63 floors. The tower is another supertall structure in the massive development of Downtown Dubai, which includes the centerpiece supertall building, Burj Khalifa.  The tower was topped out in April 2008, becoming the 6th-tallest building in Dubai and the 36th-tallest in the world. In September 2008, the tower was completed.

Dubai Opera 
 
In August 2016, Emaar opened Dubai Opera, a 2,000-seat, multi-format, performing arts center located within The Opera District of Downtown Dubai. Styled on the classic Arabian dhow, the project was developed by Emaar Properties in collaboration with architect Janus Rostock. The venue hosts a wide array of performances coming from countries around the world, including theatre, opera, ballet, concerts, musicals, stand-up comedy shows and various seasonal events. Its plans were announced by Sheikh Mohammed bin Rashid Al Maktoum in March 2012. It opened on 31 August 2016 with a performance by Plácido Domingo.

Sheikh Mohammed bin Rashid Boulevard 
Encircling Downtown Dubai, the 3.5 km road was previously known as Emaar Boulevard based on the area's developer. In December 2012, Emaar renamed the boulevard to pay tribute to Sheikh Mohammed bin Rashid Al Maktoum, Vice-President and Prime Minister of the UAE and Ruler of Dubai. The thoroughfare is famous for an impressive array of restaurants, cafes, and outdoor art exhibitions by Art Emaar, a cultural initiative of Emaar Properties.

The New Year's Gala 
Held in the center of Downtown Dubai every year, Dubai's New Year's Gala is one of the most celebrated events in Dubai. The celebration usually comprises a massive firework display and gathers hundreds of thousands of residents and tourists. In 2018, Burj Khalifa's owner and the host of the event, Emaar hosted a special light and laser show 'Light Up 2018' which brought in over a million visitors and reached over 2.5 billion people through live television broadcast and live streams on social media. 'Light Up 2018' broke a world record for the 'largest light and sound show on a single building.'

Forte Towers 
In May 2015, Emaar announced the twin tower project called Forte Towers – one of which will be a 70-storey building, making it the third tallest tower in the District.

Burj Vista 
According to a newspaper article in 2013, Emaar has launched two identically designed towers located on Muhammad Bin Rashid Boulevard in Downtown Dubai. One tower is 20 storeys high and the other is 65 storeys. Both towers consist of 640 apartments. Burj Vista offers lavish terraces that open onto stupendous views of the city's skyline. Completion and handover is scheduled for February 2018.

Grande
In September 2018, SSH has been chosen by Emaar and appointed WSP Burj Park Lake Dubai's Opera District. Tower 78 storey and 866 apartments for 30 June 2022.

Il Primo
In May 2016, Emaar announced the twin tower project called Il Primo Towers - one of which will be a 77-floor building.

References

External links 

Downtown Dubai on Emaar website
Downtown Dubai on West Gate website
Downtown Dubai on Burj Khalifa website
Skywalk Dubai Address Sky view Hotel attraction
Dubai Living Cost Tool
Theoldtownisland.com
Theoldtown.ae
Downtown Fountain View
Luxury Hotels in Downtown Dubai
Property Market Trends for Downtown Dubai

Financial districts in the United Arab Emirates
Buildings and structures under construction in Dubai
Skyscrapers in Dubai
Mixed-use developments in the United Arab Emirates